Pakkhi Hegde  is an Indian actress from Mumbai who is active mainly in Hindi serials, Bhojpuri,Tulu and Marathi films.

Career
Pakkhi Hegde a Tuluva from Mangalore, started her acting career with a lead role in a daily soap on Doordarshan named Main Banungi Miss India.

She then worked with Manoj Tiwari in Bhaiya Hamar Dayavaan, Paramveer Parsuram and Ganga Jamuna Saraswati, and with Pawan Singh in Pyar Mohabbat Zindabaad and Devar Bhabhi.

Hegde worked with Bollywood actor Amitabh Bachchan in the film Ganga Devi. She played the female protagonist in the Marathi film Sat Na Gat, with Sayaji Shinde and Mahesh Manjrekar. She has also done a Tulu film, Bangarda Kural.

She has two daughters Aashna Hedge and Khushi Hegde, and lives in Mumbai with her family.

Filmography

Television

Awards
Red FM Tulu Film Award 2014 – Best Actress for Bangarda Kural
Tulu Cinemotsava Awards 2015 – Best Actress for Bangarda Kural

See also
 List of Bhojpuri cinema actresses

References

Actresses in Bhojpuri cinema
Actresses from Mumbai
Indian film actresses
Living people
Indian television actresses
Actresses in Marathi cinema
Actresses in Hindi television
21st-century Indian actresses
Actresses in Telugu cinema
Actresses in Hindi cinema
Year of birth missing (living people)